Matthew Henry Cross (born 15 October 1992) is a Scottish cricketer who plays for Scotland and is a right-handed wicket-keeper batsman. Cross made his One Day International debut for Scotland against Canada on 23 January 2014.

Career
Matthew Cross served as the Scotland U19 vice-captain during the 2011 U19 World Cup. He is studying Engineering at Loughborough University.

Matthew became a member of Aberdeenshire CC at age nine. His performances with Loughbourgh MCCU and Scotland U19s were considered outstanding. In his career, he has also represented Nottinghamshire 2nd XI and Academy. He made a debut in the  Scottish Saltries in the 2013 YB40 match against Hampshire staged at the Ageas Bowl.

Matthew bettered his career stats more in 2013 as he got a break into the Scotland senior squad, which was followed by his selection for the T20 squad to participate in the 2013 World Cup Qualifiers in the UAE.

In June 2019, he was selected to play for the Montreal Tigers franchise team in the 2019 Global T20 Canada tournament. In July 2019, he was selected to play for the Glasgow Giants in the inaugural edition of the Euro T20 Slam cricket tournament. However, the following month the tournament was cancelled.

In September 2019, he was named in Scotland's squad for the 2019 ICC T20 World Cup Qualifier tournament in the United Arab Emirates. In September 2021, Cross was named in Scotland's provisional squad for the 2021 ICC Men's T20 World Cup.

References

External links
 

1992 births
Living people
Cricketers at the 2015 Cricket World Cup
Cricketers from Aberdeen
Essex cricketers
Loughborough MCCU cricketers
Nottinghamshire cricketers
Scotland One Day International cricketers
Scotland Twenty20 International cricketers
Scottish cricketers
Wicket-keepers